Kevin Lee is an American mixed martial artist.

Kevin Lee may also refer to:

 Kevin Lee (actor), English actor
 Kevin Lee (American football) (born 1971), American football player
 Kevin Lee (swimmer) (born 1961), British swimmer